John Godwin may refer to:

Politicians
John Godwin (died ?1547), MP for Wells
John Godwin (by 1507–56 or later), MP for Wells
John Venimore Godwin (1814–?), photographer and mayor of Bradford, 1865–1866

Sportspeople
John Godwin (baseball) (1877–1956), American baseball player
John Godwin (rower) (born 1904), British rowing coxswain

Others
John Godwin (Royal Navy officer) (1919–1945), British Naval Reserve officer during World War II
John Godwin (architect), Nigerian British architect

See also
John Goodwin (disambiguation)